Starkov is a Russian masculine surname. Its feminine counterpart is Starkova. In Latvia it is spelled as Starkovs. Notable people with the surname include:

 Aleksandrs Starkovs (born 1957), Latvian-Russian football coach
 Anatoly Starkov (born 1946), Russian Olympic cyclist
 Diana Starkova (born 1998), French model
 Ivan Starkov (born 1986), Russian footballer
 Kirill Starkov (born 1987), Danish-Russian ice hockey player
 Vadim Starkov (born 1979), Russian footballer

Fictional characters
 Alina Starkov from the Grisha trilogy

See also
 

Russian-language surnames